The International Journal of Business Communication is a quarterly peer-reviewed academic journal covering the field of business communication. The editors-in-chief are Jacqueline and Milton Mayfield (Texas A&M International University). It was established in 1963 and is published by SAGE Publishing in association with the Association for Business Communication.

Abstracting and indexing
The journal is abstracted and indexed in:
Communication Abstracts
ERIC
Linguistics and Language Behavior Abstracts
Scopus
Social Sciences Citation Index
EBSCO
ProQuest

References

External links

SAGE Publishing academic journals
English-language journals
Business and management journals
Communication journals
Publications established in 1963